Pungency refers to the taste of food commonly referred to as spiciness, hotness or heat, found in foods such as chili peppers. Highly pungent tastes may be experienced as unpleasant. The term piquancy is sometimes applied to foods with a lower degree of pungency that are "agreeably stimulating to the palate". Examples of piquant food include mustard and curry.

Terminology
In colloquial speech, the term "pungency" can refer to any strong, sharp smell or flavor. However, in scientific speech, it refers specifically to the "hot" or "spicy" quality of chili peppers. It is the preferred term by scientists as it eliminates the ambiguity arising from use of "hot", which can also refer to temperature, and "spicy", which can also refer to spices.

For instance, a pumpkin pie can be both hot (out of the oven) and spicy (due to the common inclusion of spices such as cinnamon, nutmeg, allspice, mace, and cloves), but it is not pungent. Conversely, pure capsaicin is pungent, yet it is not naturally accompanied by a hot temperature or spices.

As the Oxford, Collins, and Merriam-Webster dictionaries explain, "piquancy" can refer to mild pungency, that is, flavors and spices that are much less strong than chilli peppers, including, for example, the strong flavor of some tomatoes. In other words, pungency always refers to a very strong taste whereas piquancy refers to any spices and foods that are "agreeably stimulating to the palate", in other words to food that is spicy in the general sense of "well-spiced".

Mildly pungent or sour foods may be referred to as tangy.

Uses
Pungency is often quantified in scales that range from mild to hot. The Scoville scale measures the pungency of chili peppers, as defined by the amount of capsaicin they contain.

Pungency is not considered a taste in the technical sense because it is carried to the brain by a different set of nerves. While taste nerves are activated when consuming foods like chili peppers, the sensation commonly interpreted as "hot" results from the stimulation of somatosensory fibers in the mouth. Many parts of the body with exposed membranes that lack taste receptors (such as the nasal cavity, genitals, or a wound) produce a similar sensation of heat when exposed to pungent agents.

The pungent sensation provided by chili peppers, black pepper and other spices like ginger and horseradish plays an important role in a diverse range of cuisines across the world, such as Korean, Turkish, Jamaican, Ethiopian, Hungarian, Spanish, Indian, Burmese, Filipino (particularly Bicolano), Indonesian, Lao,  Singaporean, Malaysian, Bangladeshi, Mexican, Peruvian, Caribbean, Pakistani, Somali, Southwest Chinese (including Sichuan cuisine), Sri Lankan, Vietnamese, and Thai cuisines.

Pungent substances have been used as analgesics.

Mechanism
Pungency is sensed via chemesthesis, the sensitivity of the skin and mucous membranes to chemical substances. Substances such as piperine, capsaicin, and thiosulfinates can cause a burning or tingling sensation by inducing a trigeminal nerve stimulation together with normal taste reception. The pungent feeling caused by allyl isothiocyanate, capsaicin, piperine, and allicin is caused by activation of the heat thermo- and chemosensitive TRP ion channels including TRPV1 and TRPA1 nociceptors. The pungency of chilies may be an adaptive response to microbial pathogens.

See also

 Pyruvate scale
 Scoville scale
 Thermoception

References

External links

Gustation
Pain
Characteristics of cheese